Roger Breithaupt (date of birth unknown; date of death unknown) was a Swiss footballer who played for FC Basel. He played mainly in the position as midfielder. 

Between the years 1912 and 1916 Breithaupt played a total of 21 games for Basel, of which 13 games were in the Swiss Serie A, one in the Anglo-Cup and seven were friendly games.

In the 1912–13 season Basel won the Anglo-Cup. Bredscheider was part of the team that won the final on 29 June 1913 in the Hardau Stadium, Zürich against FC Weissenbühl Bern 5–0.

Sources and References
 Rotblau: Jahrbuch Saison 2017/2018. Publisher: FC Basel Marketing AG. 

FC Basel players
Swiss men's footballers
Switzerland international footballers
Association football midfielders